Peter Costa (born 27 January 1956, in Cyprus) to Greek Cypriot parents is a British professional poker player based in Las Vegas, Nevada.

He is most well known as the winner of the sixth series of the popular Late Night Poker television series during his time living in the United Kingdom, where he defeated Austria's Jin Cai Lin in the final heads-up encounter to take the £60,000 first prize. He was formerly nicknamed "The Silver Fox", a nickname shared by fellow poker player Mel Judah.

Costa has made four final tables at the World Series of Poker (WSOP):
 2002 $2,000 limit Texas hold 'em - 9th place ($17,200)
 2003 $2,500 seven-card stud - 9th place ($3,600)
 2005 $1,500 limit Texas hold 'em - 7th place ($57,905)
 2006 $3,000 Omaha hi/lo - 7th place ($38,861)

Costa was nominated for both the 2002 and 2003 European Poker Player of the Year awards. In addition, Costa won the Aussie Millions tournament in 2003, and at one time held the record for winning the limit hold-em tournament with the most entrants.
As of 2008, his total live tournament winnings exceed $1,700,000.

Outside the poker world, Costa's favourite movie is Groundhog Day, and he is a big fan of James Stewart. His niece, Maria Demetriou, also has numerous poker results to her credit.

References

External links
 World Poker Tour Profile
 "The Big One" – Costa's poem about the 2000 World Series of Poker main event
 BlondePoker forum post by Costa about Late Night Poker VI
 Peter Costa Hendon Mob tournament results
 Maria Demetriou Hendon Mob tournament results

1956 births
Living people
British people of Greek Cypriot descent
British poker players
British gambling writers
Cypriot emigrants to England
Naturalised citizens of the United Kingdom
British emigrants to the United States
Cypriot emigrants to the United States